Te Voy a Enamorar (Eng.: I'm Going to Make You Love Me) is the title of a studio album released by romantic music ensemble Los Ángeles de Charly. This album became their first number-one hit on the Billboard Top Latin Albums chart.

Track listing
This information from Billboard.com
Me Volví a Acordar de Ti (Alejandro Vezzani) — 3:59
La Princesita Sueña (Anibal Pastor) — 4:06
Te Voy a Enamorar (Alejandro Vezzani) — 3:42
Quinceañera (Daniel Avila) — 3:49
El Primer Beso de Amor (Anibal Pastor) — 3:51
Que Levante la Mano (Alejandro Vezzani) — 3:53
Está Muy Sola la Niña (Gustavo Avigliano) — 4:25
El Último Beso (Daniel Avila) — 3:52
Mi Llamada (Alejandro Vezzani) — 3:15
Ven a Mí (William Watson) — 3:57

Credits
This information from Allmusic.PersonnelIgnacio Rodríguez: Executive producer
Federico Ehrlich: Executive Producer
Fernando Roldán: Engineer, mixing
Ricardo Trabulsi: Photography
Varela Diseño: Graphic Design
Rudy Durand: AssistantMusicians'
William Watson: Accordion, arranger, musical direction
Ruben Amador: Conga
Charly Becies lead voices
Fernando Becies: Guiro
Alejandro Lopez: Trombone
Jonathan Martínez: support voices
José Luis Martínez: Piano
Francisco Muñoz: Timbales
Marco Olán Bass
Memo Palafox: support voices
Ricardo Rodriguez: Bass
William Valdez: Percussion

Chart performance

References

2001 albums
Los Ángeles de Charly albums
Fonovisa Records albums